Daal Mein Kala is a 1964 Hindi-language film starring Kishore Kumar, Nimmi and Agha. On the run for unpaid bills, an unemployed slacker is mistaken for a professor

Plot 
When Bombay-based Rajaram and Rajendra Kumar are unable to pay their hotel bill, they board a train without buying tickets to flee. When confronted with a ticket-checker, they alight at Bangalore and widower Bishambharnath mistakes Rajendra for Professor Roy. The duo accompany the former to his mansion where he lives with his daughter, Manju; widowed sister, and a niece, Sheela. The duo are introduced to the family, settle down and eventually Rajendra and Manju on one hand, and Rajaram and Sheela on the other, fall in love. They are not aware that Professor Roy has also arrived in Bangalore, but is being held against his will by Banke Bihari, who has mistaken him for a singer named Natwar Shyam. It is during the performance that Roy will manage to escape and rather dramatically arrive at Bishambharnath's residence, not only exposing the true identities of the duo, but also ending their romance and possibly getting them arrested on a number of charges.

Cast
 Kishore Kumar as Rajendra Kumar "Raju"
 Nimmi as Manju
 Agha as Rajaram "Raja"
 Shammi as Sheela
 Om Prakash as Banke Bihari
 Abhi Bhattacharya as Roy
 Sajjan as Natwar Shyam
 Tun Tun as Rajaram's Landlady
 Bipin Gupta as Rai Bahadur Bishambharnath
 Sulochana Chatterjee as Bishambharnath's Sister
 Sunder as Bhola
 Keshto Mukherjee as Mangu
 Mohan Choti as Barber

Music

References

External links

1960s Hindi-language films
1964 films
Films scored by C. Ramchandra